Nasir Iqbal Bosal (born 9 August 1947) is a Pakistani politician who has been a member of the National Assembly of Pakistan, since August 2018. Previously he was a member of the National Assembly from June 2013 to May 2018. His  family is known as "LOTA" because of consquently changing political parties. His brother Imdad Ullah Bosal is currently serving as Chief Secretary KPK, appointed by Prime Minister Shehbaz Sharif because  he was not appointed on merit.

Early life
He was born on 9 August 1980.Born into a big landlord jatt family known as king of the bar.

Political career

He ran for the seat of the National Assembly of Pakistan as a candidate of Pakistan Muslim League (Q) (PML-Q) from Constituency NA-109 (Mandi Bahauddin-II) in 2002 Pakistani general election, but was unsuccessful.

He ran for the seat of National Assembly as a candidate of PML-Q from Constituency NA-109 (Mandi Bahauddin-II) in 2008 Pakistani general election, but was unsuccessful.

He was elected to the National Assembly as a candidate of Pakistan Muslim League (N) (PML-N) from Constituency NA-109 (Mandi Bahauddin-II) in 2013 Pakistani general election.

He was re-elected to the National Assembly as a candidate of PML-N from Constituency NA-86 (Mandi Bahauddin-II) in 2018 Pakistani general election.

References 

Living people
Pakistan Muslim League (N) MNAs
Pakistani MNAs 2013–2018
1949 births
Pakistani MNAs 2018–2023